2008 Red Wings season can refer to:

In ice hockey:
2007-08 Detroit Red Wings season
2008-09 Detroit Red Wings season
In baseball:
2008 Rochester Red Wings season